John Welshot  (by 1473 – 1518/19) of Wells, Somerset, was an English politician.

Family
Welshot had a wife named Isabel. Together they had two sons and one daughter.

Career
He was a Member (MP) of the Parliament of England for Wells in 1510.

References

15th-century births
1510s deaths
English MPs 1510
People from Wells, Somerset